IHOP (acronym for International House of Pancakes) is an American multinational pancake house restaurant chain that specializes in American breakfast foods. It is owned by Dine Brands Global—a company formed after IHOP's purchase of Applebee's, with 99% of the restaurants run by independent franchisees.

While IHOP's focus is on breakfast foods, it also offers a menu of lunch and dinner items. The company has 1,841 locations in the Americas (United States, Canada, Mexico, Peru, Ecuador and Guatemala), the Middle East (United Arab Emirates, Kuwait, Saudi Arabia and Qatar) and the South Asian Subcontinent (India and Pakistan), including 161 that are owned by area licensees and 1,680 that are franchised. While many of its locations are open 24 hours a day, 7 days a week, the chain's minimum operating hours are 7:00 a.m. to 10:00 p.m.

History

Jerry Lapin, Al Lapin, and Albert Kallis founded International House of Pancakes in the Los Angeles, California area in 1958 with the help of Sherwood Rosenberg and William Kaye. The first restaurant opened at 4301 W. Riverside Drive in Burbank, California. The second and third locations at 8555 Vesper Avenue in Panorama City, California and 3625 Stocker Avenue in Baldwin Hills, California (a former Brown Derby restaurant) are still open for business.

The first prototype design for IHOP building was a steep-roofed A-frame building with a distinctive blue roof; the last such location to be built was completed in 1979.  While most IHOP locations no longer use the A-frame buildings, several still exist around the U.S.

In 1973, the chain's name was shortened to "IHOP" for marketing purposes, using a cartoon kangaroo in its commercials at the time, and since then the full name and acronym have been officially interchangeable.

The breakfast food menu later expanded (especially in the 1980s) to include standard lunch and dinner items found in similar restaurant chains such as Sambo's and Denny's. In 1976, at the same time as reorganization International Industries became IHOP. In December 2019, IHOP announced plans to launch a chain of fast casual breakfast restaurants called Flip'd.

Acquisition of Applebee's
On July 16, 2007, IHOP Corporation announced a plan to acquire the bar-and-grill chain Applebee's in an all-cash transaction, valued at approximately US$2.1 billion. In the arrangement, Applebee's stock holders will receive $25.50 a share. IHOP stated it would franchise most of Applebee's 500 company-owned facilities. Applebee's had 1,943 restaurants worldwide at the time, including those operated by franchisees.

Applebee's shareholders approved the acquisition with a 70% vote, which closed on November 29, 2007. A number of executives from Applebee's voted against the offer. The chain's largest individual shareholder, Applebee's director Burton "Skip" Sack, called the IHOP offer unfair to its shareholders and stated he planned to sue IHOP for a higher price be paid to him. As part of the purchase, a brand remarketing scheme and revitalization of the Applebee's image was intended. The buyout successfully closed on November 29, 2007, and the corporate entity IHOP changed its name to DineEquity on June 2, 2008.  A franchisee opened a hybrid Applebee's/IHOP restaurant in downtown Detroit in mid-2018.

Menu 

While IHOP's focus is on breakfast, serving pancakes, waffles, French toast, and omelettes, it also offers a menu of lunch and dinner items such as sandwiches, burgers, and salads.

Locations 
The company has 1,841 locations in the Americas, the Middle East, and South Asia.

Franchising agreements with M.H. Alshaya, an international restaurant-franchising firm, resulted in an agreement for Alshaya to open as many as forty IHOP locations in the Middle East, beginning in 2012. By the end of 2018, IHOP restaurants operated in six Middle Eastern countries: Kuwait, Qatar, Bahrain, the United Arab Emirates, Saudi Arabia and Lebanon. In 2019, IHOP began its foray into South America, opening three locations in Ecuador. and one location in Peru.

IHOP Express' first location opened in 2011; they are a quick service version of the chain offered at locations such as airports,  school campuses, military food courts and travel centers. The first standalone public location of the concept opened in downtown San Diego in 2011.

In 2019, IHOP announced plans to open a fast-casual restaurant, Flip'd by IHOP. Flip'd will include a menu serving pancake bowls, burgers, and fried chicken.

Marketing 
In June 2015, IHOP introduced an updated logo, removing its decorative elements and adding a curved line under the "O" and "P" letters to resemble a smiley face. The company argued that the previous logo looked too much like a frown.

In June 2018, an IHOP marketing campaign announced they would "flip" their name to "IHOb"; it was ultimately revealed to be a marketing campaign for its hamburgers, in an effort to address perceptions that IHOP was still primarily oriented towards breakfast food. The tease of the campaign led to speculation via social media regarding the intent of the change. IHOP parodied the campaign the following year to promote a new hamburger that includes a pancake as an ingredient, jokingly stating that they would refer to their burgers as "pancakes" because people wanted IHOP to "stick to pancakes".

Lawsuit
In early September 2010, IHOP filed a lawsuit in U.S. District Court in Los Angeles against International House of Prayer and six other defendants alleging trademark dilution and infringement. The lawsuit was dropped on December 21, 2010, with the dispute resolved out of court.

See also 

 Denny's
 Golden Nugget Pancake House
 List of pancake houses
 The Original Pancake House
 Pancake house
 Waffle House
 Walker Bros.

References

External links

 

1958 establishments in California
Companies based in Glendale, California
Companies based in Los Angeles
Fast-food chains of the United States
Pancake houses
Hamburger restaurants
Restaurant franchises
Restaurants established in 1958
Restaurants in Los Angeles
1976 mergers and acquisitions